Lindal and Marton is a civil parish in the Borough of Barrow-in-Furness in Cumbria, England.  It contains 14 listed buildings that are recorded in the National Heritage List for England.  All the listed buildings are designated at Grade II, the lowest of the three grades, which is applied to "buildings of national importance and special interest".  The parish contains the villages of Lindal-in-Furness and Marton, and the surrounding countryside.  The listed buildings are all in the villages, and consist of two farmhouses with farm buildings in Marton, and houses, farmhouses and farm buildings, the village hall, and the church in Lindal-in-Furness.


Buildings

References

Citations

Sources

Lists of listed buildings in Cumbria